Michael Anthony Hughes II (born February 1, 1998) is an American professional basketball player for Kaposvári KK of the Nemzeti Bajnokság I/A, the top division in Hungary. He played college basketball for the Akron Zips and the Duquesne Dukes.

Early life and high school career
Hughes joined his first basketball league at the age of five. He attended Liberty High School in Liberty, Missouri during his freshman year. Due to redistricting, Hughes transferred to Liberty North High School for his sophomore season. As a sophomore, he averaged 12.1 points and 8.7 rebounds per game. Hughes averaged 14.4 points, 12 rebounds, and 4.7 blocks per game as a junior, while shooting 59.7 percent. He earned Suburban Middle Seven All-Conference first-team honors as well as all-district accolades after helping guide Liberty North to a fifth-consecutive district championship. As a senior, Hughes averaged 22 points and 15 rebounds per game. He set school records for rebounds (979) and blocks (349) during his career. He committed to playing college basketball for Akron.

College career
Hughes averaged 1.8 points and 1.2 rebounds per game as a freshman at Akron. Following the season, he transferred to  Duquesne, following coach Keith Dambrot who was hired there. Hughes underwent surgery in the summer for stress fractures in his shins. During his redshirt season, he focused on dieting and conditioning, eventually losing 45 pounds. As a sophomore, Hughes averaged 11.2 points, 6.5 rebounds, and 2.3 blocks per game, which was second in the Atlantic 10 Conference. On December 4, 2019, he scored a career-high 23 points to go with 11 rebounds in a 71–58 win against VMI. During his junior season, Hughes was a strong defensive presence but struggled with foul trouble. He averaged 10.3 points, 6.8 rebounds, 1.5 steals and 2.7 blocks per game. As a senior, Hughes averaged 10.8 points and 7.9 rebounds per game. He finished as the program’s all-time leader in career field goal percentage, making 56.2 percent of his shot attempts, as well as fourth on Duquesne’s all-time blocks list with 177.

Professional career
On August 15, 2021, Hughes signed his first professional contract with BC Vienna of the Austrian Basketball Superliga.

Career statistics

College

|-
| style="text-align:left;"| 2016–17
| style="text-align:left;"| Akron
| 20 || 1 || 7.3 || .458 || – || .650 || 1.2 || .4 || .3 || .5 || 1.8
|-
| style="text-align:left;"| 2017–18
| style="text-align:left;"| Duquesne
| style="text-align:center;" colspan="11"|  Redshirt
|-
| style="text-align:left;"| 2018–19
| style="text-align:left;"| Duquesne
| 29 || 28 || 24.2 || .589 || .286 || .594 || 6.5 || .9 || .9 || 2.3 || 11.2
|-
| style="text-align:left;"| 2019–20
| style="text-align:left;"| Duquesne
| 30 || 28 || 24.5 || .573 || .278 || .649 || 6.8 || 1.6 || 1.5 || 2.7 || 10.3
|-
| style="text-align:left;"| 2020–21
| style="text-align:left;"| Duquesne
| 18 || 16 || 26.9 || .510 || .176 || .633 || 7.9 || 2.1 || 1.0 || 1.6 || 10.8
|- class="sortbottom"
| style="text-align:center;" colspan="2"| Career
| 97 || 73 || 21.3 || .557 || .238 || .622 || 5.8 || 1.2 || 1.0 || 1.9 || 8.9

Personal life
Hughes is the fourth of six children born to Robbie-Joe and Michael Hughes I. His father died in 2003, while competing in a men's basketball league at Longview Community College. According to an autopsy, he had an enlarged heart. Following his father's death, Hughes became close with his older brother Tony. In February 2006, his mother discovered Tony dead in his room from a self-inflicted gunshot wound at the age of 19. The loss of his older brother turned Michael into a selfish and angry player on the court, until his coaches found a way to curb his negative behavior. Hughes developed a love for reading.

References

External links
Duquesne Dukes bio
Akron Zips bio

1998 births
Living people
American men's basketball players
Basketball players from Missouri
Duquesne Dukes men's basketball players
Akron Zips men's basketball players
Centers (basketball)
People from Liberty, Missouri